Atch Lench is a village in Worcestershire, England.

External links 
 
 

Villages in Worcestershire